Gershom Bartlett (February 19, 1723 – December 23, 1798) was a stone carver who carved tombstones in colonial Connecticut and Vermont.   His carved gravestones are widespread in colonial burying grounds in eastern Connecticut as well as towns in Vermont and New Hampshire near the Connecticut River. He is often referred to as the "Hook and Eye man" due to the unique designs based on the old "Hook and Eye" garment he carved on his stones.

Early life and career 
According to old Bolton church records preserved by the Connecticut Historical Society, Gershom Bartlett was born to Samuel and Sarah Bartlett on February 19, 1723. Gershom moved to Windsor, Connecticut sometime before 1747, married Margret Darte in 1748 and soon fathered two children.  Gershom began carving tombstones in 1747, his earliest known stone in Ellington CT carved out of Windsor brownstone.

Connecticut career 

Land records show he moved back to Bolton, Connecticut in 1751 and had another daughter the next year.  During the 1750s, he bought and sold land in Bolton, and ended up building a Quarry that would later be known as Bolton Notch Quarry.  Through the 1750s, until 1773, Gershom carved over 750 gravestones out of his Bolton workshop.  His stones were almost exclusively carved from his quarried granite schist besides a few early brownstones in the Windsor region. His work was the most popular among Burying Grounds in Hebron, CT, Ellington, CT, Colchester, CT, East Windsor, CT, Wethersfield, CT, Scotland, CT, Woodstock, CT, Hartford, CT and Windham, CT, and his hometown in Bolton.  His quarry was well known for its high quality schist and other grave carvers sometimes purchased raw material from Bartlett.

Later career and death 
In 1773 due to rising land costs, Bartlett sold the Bolton Notch Quarry and his home and moved with his family to Pompanoosuc, Windsor County, Vermont.  He continued his business of gravestone carving, though now out of locally sourced Vermont Slate.  During the American Revolutionary War he joined Peter Olcott's Regiment in the Vermont Militia.  In 1778 his wife Margret died leaving 8 children. From 1773 to 1797, Gershom carved around 350 stones that can be found around Windsor, VT, Norwich, VT, Newbury, VT, and East Ryegate, Vermont. His stones were also bought by many in Western New Hampshire especially common in cemeteries in Lebanon, NH, Plainfield, NH, and Orford, NH.  He was carving well into the 1790s with known examples as late as 1797.  Gershom died in 1798 aged 75, and was buried near his wife in the Waterman Hill Cemetery in Pompanoosuc.

Gallery

References

 

1723 births
1798 deaths